{|

{{Infobox ship characteristics
|Hide header=
|Header caption=
|Ship class=
|Ship displacement=*2 966 tonnes
5 260 tonnes fully loaded
|Ship length= (172 French feet)
|Ship beam= (44' 6)
|Ship draught= (22 French feet)
|Ship speed=
|Ship range=
|Ship endurance=
|Ship test depth=
|Ship boats=
|Ship capacity=
|Ship complement=678 men
|Ship armament=*74 guns:
Lower gundeck: 28 × 36-pounder long guns
Upper gundeck: 30 × 24-pounder long guns
Forecastle and quarter deck:
16 × 8-pounder long guns
4 × 36-pounder carronades
|Ship armour=Timber
|Ship motto=
|Ship nickname=
|Ship honours=
|Ship notes=
|Ship badge=
}}
|}
The Capri was a  74-gun ship of the line of the Real Marina of the Kingdom of the Two Sicilies.

 Career Capri'' was built by engineers Jean-François Lafosse and Philippe Greslé after plans by Sané. In April 1815, she was seized by the British, but returned to Napoli in December 1815. She was broken up in 1847.

Notes

Citations

References
 
 

Ships built in Castellammare di Stabia
Téméraire-class ships of the line
1810 ships
Real Marina (Kingdom of the Two Sicilies)